Srinivas Rayaprol (born R.S. Marthandam; October 25, 1925December 7, 1998) was an Indian poet who wrote in English.  His father was the influential Telugu poet Rayaprolu Subba Rao.

Works

Author
 Bones and Distances (1968)
 Married Love and Other Poems (1972)
 Selected Poems (1995)

Editor
 East and West (1956–61)

Translator
 Perspectives- An Anthology of Telugu Short Stories  (2016)

References

Sources 
 .

English-language poets from India
20th-century Indian poets
1925 births
1998 deaths